Turstin is a surname that appears in the Domesday Survey of 1086. Notable people with the name include:

 Turstin FitzRolf
 Turstin, Count of Avranchin
 Turstin, the Fleming of Wigmore
 Turstin, the Sheriff, who held 27 manors in Cornall. 
 Turstin de Crispin de Bec Crispin

Notes

References